If Thou Wert Blind is a 1917 British silent drama film directed by Henry Edwards and Floyd Martin Thornton and starring Ben Webster, Evelyn Boucher and Joan Legge.

Cast
 Ben Webster - Hayden Strong
 Evelyn Boucher - Christine Leslie
 Joan Legge - May Barton
 Minna Grey
 Clifford Pembroke
 Sydney Lewis Ransome
 Harry Lorraine

References

External links

1917 films
British silent feature films
1917 drama films
1910s English-language films
Films directed by Henry Edwards
Films directed by Floyd Martin Thornton
British drama films
British black-and-white films
1910s British films
Silent drama films